

Events

Pre-1600
 451 – The Chalcedonian Creed, regarding the divine and human nature of Jesus, is adopted by the Council of Chalcedon, an ecumenical council.
 794 – Emperor Kanmu relocates the Japanese capital to Heian-kyō (now Kyoto).
 906 – Ahmad ibn Kayghalagh leads a raid against the Byzantine Empire, taking 4,000–5,000 captives.
1383 – The male line of the Portuguese House of Burgundy becomes extinct with the death of King Fernando, leaving only his daughter Beatrice. Rival claimants begin a period of civil war and disorder.

1601–1900
1633 – The Ming dynasty defeats the Dutch East India Company.
1707 – Four British naval vessels run aground on the Isles of Scilly because of faulty navigation. In response, the first Longitude Act is enacted in 1714.
1721 – The Russian Empire is proclaimed by Tsar Peter I after the Swedish defeat in the Great Northern War.
1730 – Construction of the Ladoga Canal is completed.
1739 – The War of Jenkins' Ear begins with the first attack on La Guaira.
1746 – The College of New Jersey (later renamed Princeton University) receives its charter
1777 – American Revolutionary War: American defenders of Fort Mercer on the Delaware River repulse repeated Hessian attacks in the Battle of Red Bank.
1784 – Russia founds a colony on Kodiak Island, Alaska.
1790 – Northwest Indian War: Native American forces defeat the United States, ending the Harmar Campaign.
1836 – Sam Houston is inaugurated as the first President of the Republic of Texas.
1844 – The Millerites (followers of Baptist preacher William Miller) anticipate the end of the world in conjunction with the Second Advent of Christ. The following day becomes known as the Great Disappointment.
1859 – Spain declares war on Morocco.
1866 – A plebiscite ratifies the annexation of Veneto and Mantua to Italy, which had occurred three days before on October 19.
1875 – The first telegraphic connection in Argentina becomes operational.
1877 – The Blantyre mining disaster in Scotland kills 207 miners.
1878 – The Bramall Lane stadium sees the first rugby match played under floodlights.
1879 – Using a filament of carbonized thread, Thomas Edison tests the first practical electric incandescent light bulb (lasting 13 hours before burning out).
1883 – The Metropolitan Opera House in New York City opens with a performance of Gounod's Faust.
1884 – The International Meridian Conference designates the Royal Observatory, Greenwich as the world's prime meridian.
1895 – In Paris an express train derails after overrunning the buffer stop, crossing almost  of concourse before crashing through a wall and falling  to the road below.

1901–present
1907 – A run on the stock of the Knickerbocker Trust Company sets events in motion that will spark the Panic of 1907.
1910 – Hawley Harvey Crippen (the first felon to be arrested with the help of radio) is convicted of poisoning his wife.
1923 – The royalist Leonardopoulos–Gargalidis coup d'état attempt fails in Greece, discrediting the monarchy and paving the way for the establishment of the Second Hellenic Republic.
1934 – In East Liverpool, Ohio, FBI agents shoot and kill notorious bank robber Pretty Boy Floyd.
1936 – Dod Orsborne, captain of the Girl Pat is convicted of its theft and imprisoned, having caused a media sensation when it went missing.
1941 – World War II: French resistance member Guy Môquet and 29 other hostages are executed by the Germans in retaliation for the death of a German officer.
1943 – World War II: In the second firestorm raid on Germany, the RAF conducts an air raid on the town of Kassel, killing 10,000 and rendering 150,000 homeless.
1946 – Over twenty-two hundred engineers and technicians from eastern Germany are forced to relocate to the Soviet Union, along with their families and equipment.
1947 – The Kashmir conflict between India and Pakistan begins, having started just after the partition of India.
1962 – Cuban Missile Crisis: President Kennedy, after internal counsel from Dwight D. Eisenhower, announces that American reconnaissance planes have discovered Soviet nuclear weapons in Cuba, and that he has ordered a naval "quarantine" of the Communist nation.
1963 – A BAC One-Eleven prototype airliner crashes in UK with the loss of all on board.
1964 – Jean-Paul Sartre is awarded the Nobel Prize in Literature, but turns down the honor.
  1964   – An all-party Parliamentary Committee selects the design which will become the new official flag of Canada.
1975 – The Soviet unmanned space mission Venera 9 lands on Venus.
1976 – Red Dye No. 4 is banned by the US Food and Drug Administration after it is discovered that it causes tumors in the bladders of dogs.
1981 – The United States Federal Labor Relations Authority votes to decertify the Professional Air Traffic Controllers Organization (PATCO) for its strike the previous August.
1983 – Two correctional officers are killed by inmates at the United States Penitentiary in Marion, Illinois. The incident inspires the Supermax model of prisons.
1987 – John Adams' opera Nixon in China premiered.
1997 – Danish fugitive Steen Christensen kills two police officers, Chief Constable Eero Holsti and Senior Constable Antero Palo, in Ullanlinna, Helsinki, Finland during his prison escape.
1999 – Maurice Papon, an official in the Vichy government during World War II, is jailed for crimes against humanity.
2005 – Tropical Storm Alpha forms in the Atlantic Basin, making the 2005 Atlantic hurricane season the most active Atlantic hurricane season until surpassed by the 2020 season.
  2005   – Bellview Airlines Flight 210 crashes in Nigeria, killing all 117 people on board.
2006 – A Panama Canal expansion proposal is approved by 77.8% of voters in a national referendum.
2007 – A raid on Anuradhapura Air Force Base is carried out by 21 Tamil Tiger commandos, with all except one dying in this attack. Eight Sri Lanka Air Force planes are destroyed and ten damaged.
2008 – India launches its first unmanned lunar mission Chandrayaan-1.
2012 – Cyclist Lance Armstrong is formally stripped of his seven Tour de France titles after being charged for doping.
2013 – The Australian Capital Territory becomes the first Australian jurisdiction to legalize same-sex marriage with the Marriage Equality (Same Sex) Act 2013.
2014 – Michael Zehaf-Bibeau attacks the Parliament of Canada, killing a soldier and injuring three other people.
2019 – Same-sex marriage is legalised, and abortion is decriminalised in Northern Ireland as a result of the Northern Ireland Assembly not being restored.

Births

Pre-1600
 955 – Qian Weijun, king of Wuyue (d. 991)
1071 – William IX, Duke of Aquitaine (d. 1126)
1197 – Juntoku, Japanese emperor (d. 1242)
1511 – Erasmus Reinhold, German astronomer and mathematician (d. 1553)
1559 – Jacques Sirmond, French scholar (d. 1651)
1587 – Joachim Jungius, German mathematician and philosopher (d. 1657)
1592 – Gustav Horn, Count of Pori (d. 1657)

1601–1900
1659 – Georg Ernst Stahl, German chemist and physician (d. 1734)
1689 – John V, Portuguese king (d. 1750)
1701 – Maria Amalia, Holy Roman Empress (d. 1756)
1729 – Johann Reinhold Forster, German pastor and botanist (d. 1798)
1749 – Cornelis van der Aa, Dutch historian and bookseller (d. 1816)
1761 – Antoine Barnave, French politician and orator (d. 1793)
1778 – Javier de Burgos, Spanish jurist and politician (d. 1848)
1781 – Louis Joseph, Dauphin of France (d. 1789
1783 – Constantine Samuel Rafinesque, Ottoman-French polymath and naturalist (d. 1840)
1809 – Volney Howard, American lawyer, jurist, and politician, Texas Attorney General (d. 1889)
1811 – Franz Liszt, Hungarian pianist and composer (d. 1886)
1818 – Leconte de Lisle, French poet and author (d. 1894)
1821 – Collis Potter Huntington, American businessman (d. 1900)
1832 – August Labitzky, Czech composer and conductor (d. 1903)
1843 – James Strachan-Davidson, English classical scholar, academic administrator, translator, and author (d. 1916)
1844 – Sarah Bernhardt, French actress and manager (d. 1923)
  1844   – Louis Riel, Canadian scholar and politician (d. 1885)
1847 – Koos de la Rey, South African general (d. 1914)
1850 – Charles Kingston, Australian politician, 20th Premier of South Australia (d. 1908)
1858 – Augusta Victoria of Schleswig-Holstein (d. 1921)
1859 – Prince Ludwig Ferdinand of Bavaria (d. 1949)
1865 – Kristjan Raud, Estonian painter and illustrator (d. 1943)
1870 – Ivan Bunin, Russian author and poet, Nobel Prize laureate (d. 1953)
  1870   – Lord Alfred Douglas, English author and poet (d. 1945)
1873 – Gustaf John Ramstedt, Finnish linguist and diplomat (d. 1950)
  1873   – Rama Tirtha, Indian philosopher and educator (d. 1906)
1875 – Théodore Monbeig, French Catholic missionary and botanist (d. 1914)
  1875   – David van Embden, Dutch economist and politician (d. 1962)
1878 – Jaan Lattik, Estonian pastor and politician, 9th Estonian Minister of Foreign Affairs (d. 1967)
1881 – Clinton Davisson, American physicist and academic, Nobel Prize laureate (d. 1958)
  1881   – Karl Bernhard Zoeppritz, German geophysicist and seismologist (d. 1908)
1882 – Edmund Dulac, French-English illustrator (d. 1953)
  1882   – N. C. Wyeth, American painter and illustrator (d. 1945)
1885 – Giovanni Martinelli, Italian tenor and actor (d. 1969)
1886 – Erik Bergman, Swedish minister (d. 1970)
1887 – John Reed, American journalist and poet (d. 1920)
1893 – Ernst Öpik, Estonian astronomer and astrophysicist (d. 1985)
  1893   – Luis Otero, Spanish footballer (d. 1955)
1894 – Mei Lanfang, Chinese actor and singer (d. 1961)
1895 – Johnny Morrison, professional baseball player (d. 1966)
1896 – Charles Glen King, American biochemist and academic (d. 1988)
  1896   – José Leitão de Barros, Portuguese film director and playwright (d. 1967)
1897 – Marjorie Flack, American author and illustrator (d. 1958)
1898 – Dámaso Alonso, Spanish poet and philologist (d. 1990)
1899 – Salarrué, Salvadoran writer and painter (d. 1975)
1900 – Ashfaqulla Khan, Indian activist (d. 1927)

1901–present
1903 – George Wells Beadle, American geneticist and academic, Nobel Prize laureate (d. 1989)
  1903   – Curly Howard, American comedian and vaudevillian (d. 1952)
1904 – Constance Bennett, American actress, singer, and producer (d. 1965)
  1904   – Saúl Calandra, Argentine football player (d. 1973)
  1904   – Karl Guthe Jansky, American physicist and radio engineer (d. 1950)
1905 – Joseph Kosma, Hungarian-French pianist and composer (d. 1969)
1906 – Kees van Baaren, Dutch composer and educator (d. 1970)
  1906   – Aurelio Baldor, Cuban mathematician and lawyer (d. 1978)
1907 – Günther Treptow, German tenor (d. 1981)
1908 – John Gould, American journalist and author (d. 2003)
  1908   – José Escobar Saliente, Spanish cartoonist (d. 1994)
1913 – Robert Capa, Hungarian-American photographer and journalist (d. 1954)
  1913   – Bảo Đại, Vietnamese emperor  (d. 1997)
  1913   – Hans-Peter Tschudi, Swiss lawyer and politician, 63rd President of the Swiss Confederation (d. 2002)
1915 – Yitzhak Shamir, Belarusian-Israeli civil servant and politician, 7th Prime Minister of Israel (d. 2012)
1917 – Joan Fontaine, British-American actress (d. 2013)
1918 – Lou Klein, American baseball player, coach, and manager (d. 1976)
1919 – Doris Lessing, British novelist, poet, playwright, Nobel Prize laureate (d. 2013)
1920 – Timothy Leary, American psychologist and author (d. 1996)
1921 – Georges Brassens, French singer-songwriter and guitarist (d. 1981)
  1921   – Alexander Kronrod, Russian mathematician and computer scientist (d. 1986)
  1921   – Harald Nugiseks, Estonian sergeant (d. 2014)
1923 – Bert Trautmann, German footballer and manager (d. 2013)
1925 – Slater Martin, American basketball player and coach (d. 2012)
  1925   – Edith Kawelohea McKinzie, Hawaiian genealogist, author, and hula expert (d. 2014)
  1925   – Robert Rauschenberg, American painter and illustrator (d. 2008)
1927 – Allan Hendrickse, South African minister and politician (d. 2005)
1928 – Clare Fischer, American pianist, composer and arranger (d. 2012)
  1928   – Nelson Pereira dos Santos, Brazilian director, producer, and screenwriter (d. 2018)
1929 – Michael Birkett, 2nd Baron Birkett, English director and producer (d. 2015)
  1929   – Dory Previn, American singer-songwriter and guitarist (d. 2012)
  1929   – Lev Yashin, Russian footballer (d. 1990)
1930 – Estela de Carlotto, Argentine human rights activist
  1930   – José Guardiola, Spanish singer (d. 2012)
1931 – Ann Rule, American police officer and author (d. 2015)
1933 – Carlos Alberto Sacheri, Argentine philosopher (d. 1974)
  1933   – Helmut Senekowitsch, Austrian footballer and manager (d. 2007)
1934 – Donald McIntyre, New Zealand opera singer
1936 – John Blashford-Snell, English soldier, author, and explorer
  1936   – Peter Cook, English architect and academic
  1936   – Jovan Pavlović, Serbian metropolitan (d. 2014)
1937 – José Larralde, Argentine singer-songwriter
  1937   – Manos Loïzos, Egyptian-Greek composer (d. 1982)
1938 – K. Indrapala, Sri Lankan historian and academic
  1938   – Derek Jacobi, English actor
  1938   – Christopher Lloyd, American actor, comedian and producer
1939 – Joaquim Chissano, Mozambican politician, 2nd President of Mozambique
  1939   – George Cohen, English footballer (d. 2022)
  1939   – Jean-Pierre Desthuilliers, French poet and critic  (d. 2013)
  1939   – Tony Roberts, American actor and singer
1941 – Ahmet Mete Işıkara, Turkish geophysicist and earthquake scientist (d. 2013)
  1941   – Charles Keating, English-American actor (d. 2014)
1942 – Bobby Fuller, American singer-songwriter and guitarist (d. 1966)
  1942   – Annette Funicello, American actress and singer (d. 2013)
1943 – Allen Coage, American-Canadian wrestler and coach (d. 2007)
  1943   – Catherine E. Coulson, American actress (d. 2015)
  1943   – Jan de Bont, Dutch director, producer, and cinematographer
  1943   – Catherine Deneuve, French actress and singer
  1943   – Seif Sharif Hamad, Zanzibari politician, 2nd Chief Minister of Zanzibar (d. 2021)
1945 – Eddie Brigati, American singer-songwriter
  1945   – Yvan Ponton, Canadian actor and game show host
  1945   – Buzz Potamkin, American director and producer, founded Buzzco Associates (d. 2012)
  1945   – Sheila Sherwood, English long jumper
  1945   – Michael Stoute, Barbadian-English horse trainer
  1945   – Leslie West, American singer-songwriter and guitarist (d. 2020)
1946 – Claude Charron, Canadian educator and politician
  1946   – Godfrey Chitalu, Zambian footballer (d. 1993)
  1946   – Deepak Chopra, Indian-American physician and author
  1946   – Elizabeth Connell, South African mezzo-soprano (d. 2012)
  1946   – Kelvin MacKenzie, English journalist
  1946   – Jaime Nebot, Ecuadorian politician
1947 – Raymond Bachand, Canadian lawyer and politician
  1947   – Haley Barbour, American lawyer and politician, 62nd Governor of Mississippi
1948 – Mike Hendrick, English cricketer, coach, and umpire
  1948   – Pierre Lartigue, French rally driver
  1948   – Debbie Macomber, American author
1949 – Stiv Bators, American singer-songwriter, guitarist, and actor (d. 1990)
  1949   – Vasilios Magginas, Greek politician, Greek Minister of Employment (d. 2015)
  1949   – Manfred Trojahn, German flute player, composer, and conductor
  1949   – Arsène Wenger, French footballer and manager
1950 – Donald Ramotar, Guyanese politician, 8th President of Guyana
1952 – Julie Dash, American director, producer, and screenwriter
  1952   – Jeff Goldblum, American actor and producer
1953 – René Arce Islas, Mexican politician
1954 – Graham Joyce, English author and educator (d. 2014)
1956 – John Adam, Australian rugby league player
  1956   – Alejandro Kuropatwa, Argentine photographer (d. 2003)
1957 – Henry Lauterbach, German jumper
  1957   – Daniel Melingo, Argentine musician
1958 – Bobby Blotzer, American drummer
1959 – Roberto Navarro, Argentine journalist
  1959   – Arto Salminen, Finnish journalist and author (d. 2005)
  1959   – Marc Shaiman, American composer and songwriter
1960 – Darryl Jenifer, American bass player
  1960   – Cris Kirkwood, American singer-songwriter and bass player
1961 – Takaaki Ishibashi, Japanese comedian, singer, and actor
  1961   – Barbara Potter, American tennis player
1962 – Bob Odenkirk, American actor and comedian
1963 – Brian Boitano, American figure skater 
1964 – Dražen Petrović, Croatian basketball player (d. 1993)
  1964   – TobyMac, American singer-songwriter and producer
1965 – Valeria Golino, Italian actress
  1965   – John Wesley Harding, English singer-songwriter and guitarist
  1965   – A. L. Kennedy, Scottish comedian, journalist, and author
  1965   – Otis Smith, American football player and coach
  1965   – Piotr Wiwczarek, Polish singer-songwriter, guitarist, and producer
1966 – Yuri Arbachakov, Russian-Japanese boxer
  1966   – Maelo Ruiz, New York City-born Puerto Rican Salsa romántica singer
1967 – Salvatore Di Vittorio, Italian composer and conductor
  1967   – Rita Guerra, Portuguese singer
  1967   – Oona King, Baroness King of Bow, English academic and politician
  1967   – Ulrike Maier, Austrian skier (d. 1994)
  1967   – Carlos Mencia, Honduran-American comedian, actor, producer, and screenwriter
  1967   – Ron Tugnutt, Canadian ice hockey player, coach, and sportscaster
1968 – Stephanie Cutter, American lawyer and political consultant
  1968   – Jay Johnston, American actor, producer, and screenwriter
  1968   – Shelby Lynne, American singer-songwriter and guitarist
  1968   – Stéphane Quintal, Canadian ice hockey player
  1968   – Shaggy, Jamaican singer-songwriter and DJ
1969 – Julio Borges, Venezuelan politician
  1969   – Héctor Carrasco, Dominican baseball player
  1969   – Spike Jonze, American actor, director, producer, and screenwriter
  1969   – Helmut Lotti, Belgian singer-songwriter
  1969   – Coque Malla, Spanish musician and actor
1970 – Winston Bogarde, Dutch footballer and manager
  1970   – Amy Redford, American actress, director, and producer
1971 – Amanda Coetzer, South African tennis player
  1971   – Kornél Dávid, Hungarian basketball player
  1971   – José Manuel Martínez, Spanish runner
  1971   – Jennifer Lee, American screenwriter, director, Chief Creative Officer of Walt Disney Animation Studios
1972 – D'Lo Brown, American wrestler and accountant
  1972   – Saffron Burrows, English-American actress
  1972   – Víctor Saldaño, the only Argentine man sentenced to death in the United States
1973 – Andrés Palop, Spanish footballer and manager
  1973   – Ichiro Suzuki, Japanese baseball player
  1973   – Mark van der Zijden, Dutch swimmer
1974 – Tim Kinsella, American singer-songwriter 
  1974   – Jeff McInnis, American basketball player
  1974   – Miroslav Šatan, Slovak ice hockey player
1975 – Martín Cardetti, Argentinian footballer and manager
  1975   – Jesse Tyler Ferguson, American actor
  1975   – Míchel Salgado, Spanish footballer
1976 – Luke Adams, Australian race walker
  1976   – Laidback Luke, Dutch DJ
  1976   – Jon Foreman, American singer-songwriter and guitarist
1978 – Dion Glover, American basketball player and coach
  1978   – Chaswe Nsofwa, Zambian footballer (d. 2007)
  1978   – Owais Shah, Pakistani-English cricketer
1979 – Doni, Brazilian footballer
1980 – Niall Breslin, Irish singer-songwriter, guitarist, producer, and footballer 
  1980   – Luke O'Donnell, Australian rugby league player
  1980   – Sonia Sui, Taiwanese model and actress
1981 – Michael Fishman, American actor and producer
  1981   – Olivier Pla, French racing driver
1982 – Robinson Canó, Dominican baseball player
  1982   – Tim Erfen, German footballer
  1982   – Heath Miller, American football player
  1982   – Mark Renshaw, Australian cyclist
1983 – Byul, South Korean singer
  1983   – Anton Müller, German footballer
  1983   – Plan B, British singer and actor
1984 – Horacio Agulla, Argentine rugby player
  1984   – Aleks Marić, Australian basketball player
1985 – Federico Ágreda, Venezuelan musician
  1985   – Hadise, Belgian-Turkish singer-songwriter and dancer
  1985   – Zac Hanson, American singer-songwriter and drummer
1986 – Chancellor, South Korean-American musician
  1986   – Kenji Ebisawa, Japanese actor
  1986   – Kara Lang, Canadian footballer
  1986   – Ștefan Radu, Romanian footballer
  1986   – Akihiro Sato, Japanese footballer
  1986   – Bassam Tariq, Pakistani-American filmmaker 
1987 – Tiki Gelana, Ethiopian runner
  1987   – Donny Montell, Lithuanian singer-songwriter
  1987   – Park Ha-sun, South Korean actress
  1987   – Reen Yu, Taiwanese actress
1988 – Sarah Barrow, English diver 
  1988   – Parineeti Chopra, Indian actress
  1988   – Elena Muhhina, Estonian figure skater
  1988   – Aykut Demir, Turkish footballer
1990 – Nicolás Francella, Argentine actor
  1990   – Jonathan Lipnicki, American actor
1992 – Sofia Vassilieva, American actress
1993 – Charalambos Lykogiannis, Greek footballer
1995 – Saidy Janko, Swiss footballer
1996 – B.I, South Korean singer-songwriter and dancer 
  1996   – Johannes Høsflot Klæbo, Norwegian ski runner

Deaths

Pre-1600
 726 – Itzamnaaj K'awiil, a Maya ruler of Dos Pilas
 741 – Charles Martel, Frankish king (b. 688)
 842 – Abo, Japanese prince (b. 792)
1383 – Ferdinand I of Portugal (b. 1345)
1455 – Johannes Brassart, Flemish composer
1493 – James Douglas, 1st Earl of Morton
1565 – Jean Grolier de Servières, French book collector (b. 1479)

1601–1900
1604 – Domingo Báñez, Spanish theologian (b. 1528)
1626 – Kikkawa Hiroie, Japanese daimyō (b. 1561)
1708 – Hermann Witsius, Dutch theologian and academic (b. 1636)
1751 – William IV, Prince of Orange (b. 1711)
1761 – Louis George, Margrave of Baden-Baden (b. 1702)
1755 – Elisha Williams, American minister, academic, and jurist (b. 1694)
1792 – Guillaume Le Gentil, French astronomer (b. 1725)
1847 – Sahle Selassie, Ethiopian ruler (b. 1795)
1853 – Juan Antonio Lavalleja, Uruguayan general and politician, President of Uruguay (b. 1784)
1859 – Louis Spohr, German violinist and composer (b. 1784)
1883 – George Coulthard, Australian cricketer and footballer (b. 1856)
  1883   – Thomas Mayne Reid, Irish-American soldier and author (b. 1818)
1885 – Lewis Majendie, English politician (b. 1835)
1891 – Ernst von Fleischl-Marxow, Austrian physiologist and physician (b. 1846)

1901–present
1902 – Herman Adolfovich Trautschold, German geologist and paleontologist (b. 1817)
1906 – Paul Cézanne, French painter (b. 1839)
1914 – Konishiki Yasokichi I, Japanese sumo wrestler, the 17th Yokozuna (b. 1866)
1917 – Bob Fitzsimmons, English-American boxer (b. 1863)
  1917   – Charles Pardey Lukis, founder of the Indian Journal of Medical Research and later Director-General of the Indian Medical Service (b. 1857)
1927 – Borisav Stanković, Serbian author (b. 1876)
1928 – Andrew Fisher, Scottish-Australian lawyer and politician, 5th Prime Minister of Australia (b. 1862)
1934 – Pretty Boy Floyd, American gangster (b. 1904)
1935 – Edward Carson, Irish-English lawyer and politician, Attorney General for England and Wales (b. 1854)
  1935   – Ettore Marchiafava, Italian physician (b. 1847)
1941 – Guy Môquet, French militant (b. 1924)
1952 – Ernst Rüdin, Swiss psychiatrist, geneticist, and eugenicist (b. 1874)
1954 – Jibanananda Das,  Bangladeshi-Indian author and poet (b. 1899)
1956 – Hannah Mitchell, English activist (b. 1872)
1959 – George Bouzianis, Greek painter and educator (b. 1885)
  1959   – Joseph Cahill, Australian politician, 29th Premier of New South Wales (b. 1891)
1965 – Muriel George,  English singer and actress (b. 1883)
1969 – Tommy Edwards, American singer-songwriter (b. 1922)
1972 – James K. Baxter, New Zealand poet, writer, theologian, and social commentator. (b. 1926)
1973 – Pablo Casals, Catalan cellist and conductor (b. 1876)
1979 – Nadia Boulanger, French composer and educator (b. 1887)
  1979   – Mieko Kamiya, Japanese psychiatrist and author (b. 1914)
1982 – Richard Hugo, American poet (b. 1923)
1985 – Viorica Ursuleac, Romanian soprano and educator (b. 1894)
1986 – Jane Dornacker, American actress and singer (b. 1947)
  1986   – Thorgeir Stubø, Norwegian guitarist and composer (b. 1943)
  1986   – Ye Jianying, Chinese general and politician, Head of State of the People's Republic of China (b. 1897)
  1986   – Albert Szent-Györgyi, Hungarian-American physiologist and biochemist, Nobel Prize laureate (b. 1893)
1987 – Lino Ventura, Italian-French actor (b. 1919)
1988 – Cynthia Freeman, American author (b. 1915)
1989 – Ewan MacColl, English singer-songwriter, producer, actor, and playwright (b. 1915)
  1989   – Jacob Wetterling, American kidnapping victim (b. 1978)
1990 – Louis Althusser, Algerian-French philosopher and academic (b. 1918)
1991 – Hachiro Kasuga, Japanese singer and actor (b. 1924)
1992 – Red Barber, American sportscaster (b. 1908)
  1992   – Cleavon Little, American actor (b. 1939)
1993 – Innes Ireland, English racing driver and engineer (b. 1930)
1995 – Kingsley Amis, English novelist, poet, critic (b. 1922)
  1995   – Mary Wickes, American actress and singer (b. 1910)
1997 – Leonid Amalrik, Russian animator, director, and screenwriter (b. 1905)
1998 – Eric Ambler, English author, screenwriter, and producer (b. 1909)
2001 – Helmut Krackowizer, Austrian motorcycle racer and journalist (b. 1922)
2002 – Richard Helms, American intelligence agent and diplomat, 8th Director of Central Intelligence (b. 1913)
  2002   – Geraldine of Albania (b. 1915)
2005 – Arman, French-American painter and sculptor (b. 1928)
  2005   – Tony Adams, Irish-American actor and producer (b. 1953)
2006 – Arthur Hill, Canadian-American actor (b. 1922)
2007 – Ève Curie, French pianist and journalist (b. 1904)
2009 – Don Lane, American-Australian actor, singer, and talk show host (b. 1933)
  2009   – Soupy Sales, American comedian and actor (b. 1926)
2010 – Eio Sakata, Japanese Go player (b. 1920)
2011 – Sultan bin Abdulaziz, Saudi Arabian prince (b. 1930)
2012 – Betty Binns Fletcher, American lawyer and judge (b. 1923)
  2012   – Mike Morris, English talk show host (b. 1946)
  2012   – Gabrielle Roth, American dancer, singer, and author (b. 1941)
2013 – Marylou Dawes, Canadian pianist and educator (b. 1933)
  2013   – Lajos Für, Hungarian historian and politician, Minister of Defence of Hungary (b. 1930)
  2013   – William Harrison, American author and screenwriter (b. 1933)
  2013   – James Robinson Risner, American general and pilot (b. 1925)
2014 – George Francis, English footballer and soldier (b. 1934)
  2014   – John-Roger Hinkins, American religious leader and author (b. 1934)
  2014   – Ashok Kumar, Indian director and cinematographer (b. 1941)
  2014   – John Postgate, English microbiologist, author, and academic (b. 1922)
2015 – Willem Aantjes, Dutch civil servant and politician (b. 1923)
  2015   – Çetin Altan, Turkish journalist and politician (b. 1927)
  2015   – Murphy Anderson, American illustrator (b. 1926)
  2015   – Arnold Klein, American dermatologist and author (b. 1945)
  2015   – Joshua Wheeler, American sergeant (b. 1975)
2016 – Steve Dillon, British comic book artist (b. 1962)
  2016   – Sheri S. Tepper, American writer (b. 1929)
2017 – George Young, Australian musician, songwriter and record producer (b. 1946)
  2017   – Paul Weitz, American astronaut (b. 1932)
2021 – Peter Scolari, American actor (b. 1955)

Holidays and observances
Christian feast day:
Aaron the Illustrious (Syriac Orthodox Church)
Abercius of Hieropolis
Bertharius
Cordula
Donatus of Fiesole
Marcus of Jerusalem
Mary Salome
Mellonius of Rouen
Nunilo and Alodia
Pope John Paul II
Theodoret of Antioch
October 22 (Eastern Orthodox liturgics)
Earliest day on which Labour Day can fall, while October 28 is the latest; celebrated on the fourth Monday in October (New Zealand)
Fechner Day (International observance) 
International Stuttering Awareness Day 
Jidai Matsuri (Kyoto, Japan)
National Santri Day (Indonesia)
Wombat Day (Australia)

References

Bibliography

External links

 
 
 

Days of the year
October